Justice Niles may refer to:

Addison Niles, associate justice of the Supreme Court of California
Nathaniel Niles (politician), associate justice of the Vermont Supreme Court
Silas Niles, associate justice of the Rhode Island Supreme Court